Robert Bateson may refer to:

Sir Robert Bateson, 1st Baronet (1782–1863), British MP for Londonderry 1830–1842
Robert Bateson (politician) (1816–1843), his son, British MP for Londonderry 1842–1843
Robert Bateson (RAF officer) (1912–1986), Royal Air Force officer

See also
Bateson (surname)